Karolina Durán Zamora (born 7 January 1995) is a Costa Rican footballer who plays as a forward. She has been a member of the Costa Rica women's national team.

International career
Durán capped for Costa Rica at senior level during the 2012 CONCACAF Women's Olympic Qualifying Tournament qualification.

References

1995 births
Living people
Costa Rican women's footballers
Women's association football forwards
Costa Rica women's international footballers
Pan American Games competitors for Costa Rica
Footballers at the 2011 Pan American Games